Liam Kelly may refer to:

 Liam Kelly (footballer, born 1975), Irish former football player
 Liam Kelly (footballer, born 1990), English-born Scottish international footballer, for Coventry City FC
 Liam Kelly (footballer, born 1995), Irish football player, for Oxford United FC
 Liam Kelly (footballer, born 1996), Scottish football goalkeeper
 Liam Kelly (Irish republican) (1922–2011), Irish republican and politician
 Liam Kelly, Irish musician, member of Dervish (band)

See also 
 Liam Kelley, American historian of Vietnamese history